Grant's big-eyed tree frog (Nyctimystes granti) is a species of frog in the subfamily Pelodryadinae found in New Guinea. Its natural habitats are subtropical or tropical moist lowland forests and rivers.

References

Nyctimystes
Amphibians of New Guinea
Amphibians described in 1914
Taxonomy articles created by Polbot